Mounir Obbadi (born 4 April 1983) is a former professional footballer who played as an attacking midfielder. Born in France, he represented the Morocco national team at international level, making 21 appearances between 2001 and 2017.

Career
Obbadi started his professional career at Paris Saint-Germain, although he never played a first team game. After a years loan spell at Angers SCO he made the switch permanent in 2005. In January 2007, he joined Ligue 2 club ESTAC, before being loaned back to Angers that season. After ESTAC were relegated, he broke into their first team, and still plays for them. As a playmaker, he was one of the most influent players on the field, and helped the club to climb from Championnat National (French third tier) to Ligue 1 over three seasons (2010 to 2012). He signed for Ligue 2 team AS Monaco in January 2013 and secured promotion at the end of the season, playing in a box-to-box role. On 15 July 2014, he was loaned out to Serie A side Hellas Verona ahead of the 2014–15 season.

Obbadi joined Ligue 1 club Lille OSC in July 2015, with a two-year contract.

After one season at Laval, Obbadi joined AS Poissy on 25 June 2019.

References

External links
 
 
 
 
 Mounir Obbadi foot-national.com Profile

1983 births
Living people
French sportspeople of Moroccan descent
People from Meulan-en-Yvelines
Footballers from Yvelines
Association football midfielders
Moroccan footballers
Morocco international footballers
French footballers
Paris Saint-Germain F.C. players
Angers SCO players
ES Troyes AC players
AS Monaco FC players
Hellas Verona F.C. players
Lille OSC players
OGC Nice players
Raja CA players
Stade Lavallois players
AS Poissy players
Ligue 2 players
Ligue 1 players
Championnat National players
Serie A players
Moroccan expatriate footballers
Expatriate footballers in Italy
Moroccan expatriate sportspeople in Italy
2017 Africa Cup of Nations players